Deepali Kishore (born 6 January 1989) is an Indian singer. She was a finalist of Indian Idol 3. She also appeared along with Bollywood actor John Abraham and performed a group song from film Goal. She has sung a song for movie Don Muthuswami. The song is "I Love You", composed by Anu Malik. She has hosted the auditions and the Roobaroos with Meiyang Chang in Indian Idol season 4. She has hosted a music show Bharat Ki Shaan: Singing Star on DD National, with Abhas Joshi. Deepali is acting in the Bhojpuri soap Badki Malkayen on Mahua TV.
Her latest Bollywood song is Ji huzori from ki & ka opposite Mithoon. Deepali is married to singer Aishwariya Nigam.

References
 Indian Idol Season 3
 Indian Idol Gala Finalists
 Patna Girl in News
  Deepali recorded her first songs
 Link to Emon-Deepali first song recording

1989 births
Living people
Indian women playback singers
Musicians from Patna
Singers from Bihar
Women musicians from Bihar
21st-century Indian women singers
21st-century Indian singers